The Seekers  is the seventh studio album by Australian group the Seekers. The album was released in May 1975. Louisa Wisseling provided the vocals. It was the first The Seekers' album not to feature the vocals of Judith Durham.
The lead single "Sparrow Song" was released in May 1975, peaking at number 7 on the Kent Music Report. A second single "Reunion" was released in November 1975 and peaked at number 83.

Background
The Seekers had been a successful group in the 1960s, disbanding in July 1968 when lead singer Judith Durham left the group. In 1972, the band planned to reform, but needed a suitable female vocalist to replace Durham. Band member Athol Guy asked his friend Buddy England for assistance who said; "After some time looking and listening I came across Louisa Wisseling at a restaurant/club called The Swagman ... took Athol to have a listen ... made Louisa an offer and there you are. I was also asked to vet material for the group to record... I signed them to the Astor label, then went to England to work on the production with the rest of the guys. The album was a success."

Track listing
All tracks composed by Bruce Woodley; except where indicated
Side A
 "Sparrow Song" - 3:56
 "Goodbye Again" (John Denver) - 4:31
 "Please Come to Boston" (Dave Loggins) - 3:50
 "Sweet Surrender" (John Denver) - 3:51
 "Freedom" - 3:52
 "A Never Ending Song" - 3:21

Side B
 "I'll Have to Say I Love You in a Song" (Jim Croce) - 2:34
 "Sweet Sympathy" - 4:18
 "Can We Learn to Get Along" - 3:23
 "Break These Chains" - 3:13
 "Every Road Leads Back to You" (Barry Mason, Keith Potger) - 4:14	
 "Reunion" - 5:32

Weekly charts

References

External links

The Seekers albums
Polydor Records albums
1975 albums
Albums recorded at IBC Studios